Mi Teleférico (English: My Cable Car), also known as Teleférico La Paz–El Alto (La Paz–El Alto Cable Car), is an aerial cable car urban transit system serving the La Paz–El Alto metropolitan area in Bolivia. As of October 2019, the system consists of 26 stations (36 if transfer stations are counted separately per line) along ten lines: Red, Yellow, Green, Blue, Orange, White, Sky Blue, Purple, Brown, and Silver. Further lines and extensions are in planning or construction.

Upon the completion of the  Phase One (Red, Yellow, and Green Lines) in 2014, the system was considered to be the longest aerial cable car system in the world. While other urban transit cable cars like Medellín's Metrocable complement existing rapid transit systems, Mi Teleférico is the first system to use cable cars as the backbone of the urban transit network. In 2018, Mi Teleférico won a Latam Smart City Award in the category of "Sustainable urban development and mobility".

Mi Teleférico was planned in order to address a number of problems, including a precarious public transit system that could not cope with growing user demands, the high cost in time and money of traveling between La Paz and El Alto, chaotic traffic with its subsequent environmental and noise pollution, and a growing demand for gasoline and diesel fuel, which are subsidized by the state.

History

Background 
The neighboring cities of El Alto and La Paz are the second and third most populous cities in Bolivia. La Paz, the national capital of Bolivia, is located in a canyon on the Choqueyapu River, while El Alto, a poorer but growing city with a majority indigenous population, is located above it on the Altiplano plateau. Prior to the construction of the cable car, travel between La Paz and El Alto was limited to heavily crowded, winding streets, and the only public transit consisted of buses and minibuses that often got stuck in traffic. In order to alleviate this situation, the idea of connecting the two cities with a cable car has been proposed several times since the 1970s.

In the 1970s, a team planned an aerial cable car route connecting the neighborhoods of La Ceja in El Alto and La Florida in La Paz.

In 1990, a feasibility study was undertaken for a cable car between La Ceja in El Alto and the Plaza de San Francisco in La Paz. The most controversial aspects of the plan were the fare, the low passenger capacity, and the proximity to the Basilica of San Francisco. During the 1991 municipal elections, the Conciencia de Patria (CONDEPA) party candidate argued against a cable car, claiming it would cost minibus drivers their livelihoods and impact privacy.

In the 1993 municipal elections, mayoral candidate Mónica Medina, also of the CONDEPA party, made aerial transit one of her campaign promises, modifying the original idea of a single line into a system of interconnected cable car lines with a hub on Lainkakota hill.

In 2003, the project returned to the table, but details such as tower placement stalled the work. The planned San Francisco terminal was moved to the Zapata soccer field near the Higher University of San Andrés, but the idea was still too controversial to move ahead.

In 2011, the Municipal Government of La Paz carried out a study on potential ridership demand, and found that the city handles 1.7 million trips per day, including 350,000 trips between La Paz and El Alto.

Phase One 

In July 2012, Bolivian President Evo Morales Ayma drafted a bill for the construction of a cable car to connect El Alto with the center and south of La Paz and sent it to the Plurinational Legislative Assembly. Morales called together the mayor of La Paz, Luis Revilla, the mayor of El Alto, Édgar Patana, and the governor of the La Paz Department, César Cocarico, to participate in the project. The project was financed by the country's National Treasury with an internal loan from the Central Bank of Bolivia.

The system's Phase One consisted of the Red Line (Línea Roja), Yellow Line (Línea Amarilla), and Green Line (Línea Verde), which are also the colors of the Bolivian flag. Phase One was inaugurated and began operation on 30 May 2014.

Phase Two 
On 1 July 2014, Evo Morales announced five new interconnected lines to be built in the coming years. On 26 January 2015, the law permitting construction of Phase Two was passed, increasing the number of new lines to six and committing US $450 million to the project. A seventh line was announced in February 2016, and an eighth was announced in July 2016. On 13 July 2017, it was announced that the cost of Phase 2 would be increased to US $506 million.

Phase Two began operation in 2017 with the inauguration of the Blue Line (Línea Azul) on 3 March 2017, followed by the Orange Line (Línea Naranja) on 29 September 2017. On 24 March 2018, the White Line (Línea Blanca) and the first section of the Sky Blue Line (Línea Celeste) were opened. The second and final section of the Sky Blue Line was opened on 14 July 2018. The remaining five lines will be the Purple Line (Línea Morada), the Brown Line (Línea Café), the Silver Line (Línea Plateada), and the Gold Line (Línea Dorada). As of March 2018, the Purple and Silver Lines are under construction.

Other cities

Oruro 
Mi Teleférico contributed to the construction of the Teleférico Turístico "Virgen del Socavón" (Our Lady of the Mines Tourist Cable Car) in Oruro, Bolivia. The cable car connects the city center to the Virgen del Socavón statue and shrine on nearby Santa Bárbara hill, which plays an important role in the city's carnaval celebrations. The cable car, which opened on 7 February 2018, consists of a single  line with two stations and 16 cars. It has a capacity of 1000 passengers per hour, and a one-way trip takes approximately 3 minutes. The project was originally due to open in November 2016, but it suffered repeated delays until Mi Teleférico took over construction work in 2017.

Sucre 
As of 2017, the Empresa Estatal de Transporte por Cable "Mi Teleférico" was in the process of planning a cable car system for the city of Sucre.

Lines

Lines in operation 
The Mi Teleférico system consists of monocable aerial cable car lines. Most lines have a maximum capacity of 3000 passengers per hour, while the Sky Blue Line has a capacity of 4000 passengers per hour. The network has a total of seven lines, with 443 cars on the Red, Green, and Yellow Lines, 208 on the Blue Line, 127 on the Orange Line, 131 on the White Line, and 155 on the Sky Blue Line. Each car seats 10 passengers. Cars depart every 12 seconds, and the network is open 17 hours a day.

According to Mi Teleférico, the Red, Yellow, and Green Lines combined transport between 80,000 and 90,000 passengers per day. Of these, the Yellow and Red Lines, the two lines that link La Paz and El Alto, account for some 70,000 rides. During its opening week, the Blue Line moved 41,000 passengers in one day, and it has increased ridership on the Red Line by 15%.

Future lines

Stations
All stations have both a Spanish name and an Aymara name.

Red Line (Línea Roja)

Yellow Line (Línea Amarilla)

Green Line (Línea Verde)

Blue Line (Línea Azul)

Orange Line (Línea Naranja)

White Line (Línea Blanca)

Sky Blue Line (Línea Celeste)

Purple Line (Línea Morada)

Brown Line (Línea Café)

Silver Line (Línea Plateada)

Gold Line (Línea Dorada)

Incidents
When the system first opened, riders experienced delays of 2 to 25 minutes, which the government attributed to technical problems and riders holding doors.

On February 14, 2015, a eucalyptus tree fell, striking an empty cabin on the Yellow Line, dislodging the cable and leaving passengers stranded for three hours. Nineteen passengers suffered bruises and other minor injuries, but there were no major injuries, and only minor damage to three cabins.

On May 9, 2016, a tower from the construction of the Blue Line fell, with nine injured and no deaths.

Intermodal transfers
Beginning in December 2014, the Mi Teleférico and La Paz Bus systems began allowing passenger transfers at the Chuqui Apu station.

Mobile application 
Mi Teleférico has released a mobile application for Android and iOS with information about existing and future lines.

Network map

References

External links 

  

La Paz
Aerial tramways in Bolivia
Gondola lifts
Transport in Bolivia
Public transport in Bolivia
2014 establishments in Bolivia